CBAC may refer to:

 Unicode hex code: CBAC, see List of modern Hangul characters in ISO/IEC 2022–compliant national character set standards
 CBAC-FM, a radio station (99.9 FM) licensed to Tuktoyaktuk, Northwest Territories, Canada (formerly CBAC (AM))
 Canadian Baptists of Atlantic Canada
 Chinese Benevolent Association of Canada, see Chinese Canadians in Greater Vancouver
 Canadian Breath Analyzer Company, a company providing designated driver services
 Context-based access control, a firewall feature that filters packets
 WJEC (exam board) (Welsh Joint Education Committee), a Welsh exam board

See also

 
 BAC (disambiguation)
 Kbac (disambiguation)
 WBAC 1340 AM